Antioch Hall, North and South Halls are a group of historic buildings on the campus of Antioch College in Yellow Springs, Ohio, United States.  They were the college's three original buildings, and were listed together on the National Register of Historic Places listings in Greene County, Ohio in 1975.

History

Antioch Hall
Antioch Hall was constructed in the 1852–53 timeframe by architect Alpheus Marshall Merrifield.  It combines elements of Romanesque, Greek Revival and Gothic architectural styles, the latter being most noticeable in its towers.

It underwent a massive renovation from 1958 to 1962. This included the inset of a concrete structure inside the original building which stabilized it and insulated its interior against weather and degradation. The renovation also created four floors, instead of the previous  three, and relocated its entrance from the east side to the west side.

Antioch Hall was closed along with the College in June 2008; however, while the College reopened, Antioch Hall did not.  Since the campus's central Power Plant usually provided steam heating to this building and others, and because the Power Plant went offline with the general closure in 2008, Antioch Hall lacked heating which in turn led to plumbing failures and flooding in February of 2009.  Some restoration has been done, the largest from a $500,000 directed grant from Yellow Springs Community Foundation in 2019, intended to tackle projects of immediate need such as reintroducing heating.  But considerable additional funding is needed to bring the building back to usefulness, with estimates ranging from $7.5 million to $20 million.

North Hall
North Hall is an operational residence hall.  Its first residents were the entering class of 1853.   In 1953 it was extensively reconstructed following a significant fire in February of that year, with use of an interior steel framework supporting four-inch reinforced concrete floors which made the building more fireproof.  In 2011 it underwent a $5.7 million renovation effort to combine both comfortable and sustainable living, and reopened in 2012.  The renovation project achieved a LEED energy-efficiency Gold Level Certification on July 26, 2013, and was the oldest building in the country to obtain such a rating, taking the title from the U.S. Treasury Building. The project included solar panels on the building’s roof, and twenty-five 600'-deep geothermal wells for heating and cooling.

South Hall
South Hall also opened in 1853, as the college’s men’s dormitory.  Renovated in 1994, it too was damaged after closure in 2008 when a sprinkler system pipe on the fourth floor of the unheated building burst in December of that year, flooding the structure’s east end.  However, contractors and volunteers pushed through a cleanup effort to dry it out.   It reopened after some exterior renovations in January of 2010.  It is the location of college offices, as well as Herndon Gallery, which is used for exhibitions and academic conferences.

See also 
 Horace Mann

References 

National Register of Historic Places in Greene County, Ohio
School buildings completed in 1852
Buildings and structures in Greene County, Ohio
Antioch College
1852 establishments in Ohio